Mahagathbandhan (MGB), (Hindi: महागठबंधन) also known as Grand Alliance, is a coalition of political parties in the Eastern state of Bihar in India, formed ahead of the 2015 Vidhan Sabha elections in Bihar. The alliance consists of Rashtriya Janata Dal (RJD), Janata Dal (United), Indian National Congress (INC) and Left parties including Communist Party of India (CPI), Communist Party of India (Marxist–Leninist) Liberation-CPIML (Liberation) and Communist Party of India (Marxist) (CPIM), with Nitish Kumar (Chief Minister) as the leader and Tejashwi Yadav (Deputy Chief Minister) as the chairperson. It is the ruling coalition government in Bihar.

In August 2022, the Mahagathbandhan, Janata Dal (United) and Hindustan Awam Morcha joined to form 2/3th Majority government in Bihar Legislative Assembly.

History
On 7 June 2015, Lalu Prasad Yadav announced the RJD was joining in an alliance with the JD(U) for the election. On 13 July 2015, he led a march demanding that the central government release its findings from the Socio Economic Caste Census 2011 (SECC) on caste. Union Minister Ram Vilas Paswan supported a comprehensive classification of caste data of SECC 2011 before its release. BJP Leader Sushil Kumar Modi called for a rectification of errors in the cases of 1.46 crore people in India, including 1.75 lakh in Bihar, before releasing the caste data.

On 3 August, incumbent Chief Minister Nitish Kumar declared that he would not stand in the election. On 11 August, he announced the seat-sharing formula, according to which JD(U) and RJD will contest 100 seats each, while Congress will contest 40 seats in Bihar. NCP pulled out of this alliance later. On 23 September, Nitish Kumar announced the list of 242 candidates for the JDU-RJD-INC alliance. OBCs were most favoured in the alliance ticket distribution plan. 10% of tickets were allotted to women candidate by the alliance.

Nitish Kumar was the declared chief ministerial candidate for the Mahagathbandhan (Grand Alliance). Kumar started his Har Ghar Dastak (door-to-door) campaign on 2 July. Initially there were definite political overtures when both Lalu Prasad Yadav and Nitish Kumar shared stage together in a public event commemorating former chief minister Satyendra Narain Sinha's birth anniversary that witnessed veiled attacks on each other, the last time they did it in public. Prashant Kishor was a key election strategist for the alliance.

The Mahagathbandhan contested in Bihar legislative assembly elections of 2015 against Bharatiya Janata Party and its key allies Lok Janshakti Party and Rashtriya Lok Samata Party . The Bharatiya Janata Party and its allies lost badly making the way for JD (U)+RJD+Congress to triumph with 178 out of 243 seats. The BJP and its allies managed to get only 58 seats.

Dissent and defection
After successfully winning the elections of 2015, the defection in Mahagathbandhan occurred with alleged attempt of Rashtriya Janata Dal leaders to break Janata Dal (United) elected legislators. Nitish Kumar, the then leader of JD (U) and the Chief Minister for fifth time was thus forced to join the Bharatiya Janata Party and NDA once again to secure the interest of his parties.

However, the entry of JD (U) made other allies of Bhartiya Janata Party embarrassed . Thus the rival party of JD (U), Rashtriya Lok Samata Party drifted away with its leader Upendra Kushwaha from the hold of NDA . The drifting away of Rashtriya Lok Samata Party created uncertainties in the camp of National Democratic Alliance over shifting of the support of Koeri caste on whom RLSP was thought to have strong hold. But in 2019 General Elections  the JD(U) balanced the loss incurred due to the defection of Upendra Kushwaha and Bharatiya Janata Party and Janata Dal (United) secured victory over the putatively put alliance of RJD+RLSP+INC+HAM+VIP parties. Subsequently, VIP and HAM switched to the NDA and the RLSP merged with JD(U).

Return to Power 
In August 2022, Rashtriya Janata Dal, Janata Dal (United), Indian National Congress,  Communist Party of India (Marxist–Leninist) Liberation, Communist Party of India (Marxist), Communist Party of India and Hindustan Awam Morcha joined again to form 2/3rd Majority government in Bihar Legislative Assembly.

Current members

See also
Mahagathbandhan (2019)
Mahagathbandhan (Jharkhand)
Maha Vikas Aghadi
Grand Democratic Secular Front
Progressive Democratic Alliance (Bihar)

References

External links
2020 Bihar State Elections

Bihar
2020 Bihar Legislative Assembly election
2020 in Indian politics
2020